The 1931 Boston Red Sox season was the 31st season in the franchise's Major League Baseball history. The team's home field was Fenway Park. The Red Sox finished sixth in the American League (AL) with a record of 62 wins and 90 losses, 45 games behind the Philadelphia Athletics.

The Red Sox played their Sunday home games at Braves Field this season, as had been the case since the team's 1929 season, due to Fenway being close to a house of worship. The team played a total of 15 home games at Braves Field during the 1931 season, all on Sundays.

This was the first season that the Red Sox wore uniform numbers.

Outfielder Earl Webb set the single-season mark of 67 doubles which is still a major league record to this day.

Regular season

Season standings

Record vs. opponents

Opening Day lineup

Roster 

This was the first season that the Red Sox wore uniform numbers.

Player stats

Batting

Starters by position 
Note: Pos = Position; G = Games played; AB = At bats; H = Hits; Avg. = Batting average; HR = Home runs; RBI = Runs batted in

Other batters 
Note: G = Games played; AB = At bats; H = Hits; Avg. = Batting average; HR = Home runs; RBI = Runs batted in

Pitching

Starting pitchers 
Note: G = Games pitched; IP = Innings pitched; W = Wins; L = Losses; ERA = Earned run average; SO = Strikeouts

Other pitchers 
Note: G = Games pitched; IP = Innings pitched; W = Wins; L = Losses; ERA = Earned run average; SO = Strikeouts

Relief pitchers 
Note: G = Games pitched; W = Wins; L = Losses; SV = Saves; ERA = Earned run average; SO = Strikeouts

References

External links 
1931 Boston Red Sox team page at Baseball Reference
1931 Boston Red Sox season at baseball-almanac.com

Boston Red Sox seasons
Boston Red Sox
Boston Red Sox
1930s in Boston